Otters Club, established as a sporting institution during its inception in 1973, is one of the premier clubs in the city of Mumbai, India. Located near the Jogger's Park on Carter Road, Bandra, it is a members-only club that continues to follow the traditions set by its founder: emphasis on sport, especially swimming and squash.

The club counts many Indian celebrities as its members, including, amongst others, Gauri Khan, Salman Khan & family, Sameera Reddy, Raveena Tandon, Sharman Joshi, Ranveer Singh and Ritesh Sidhwani. Its first president was veteran Indian actor Dilip Kumar.

The club's Swimming and Squash Departments have produced many athletes who have represented India at an international level. Emphasis on excellence continues, as does its tradition of churning out sportspersons.
A number of sports meetings are held in its swimming pool and squash courts, as well as its bridge and billiards rooms.

See also
Bandra
Pali Hill

References

External links
Otters Club website

Organisations based in Mumbai
Sport in Mumbai
1973 establishments in Maharashtra
Organizations established in 1973